1965 Records is a London-based subsidiary record label of SonyBMG. Formed in 2006, the label was founded by James Endeacott (formerly of Rough Trade Records), who first signed The Libertines. The label features bands who are primarily indie rock/pop, and are best known for signing Dundee based four-piece The View.

History
1965 Records took their name from the year of Endeacott's birth, as well as his favourite year for music. Originating in May 2006, the company initially releasing five separate limited edition 7-inch vinyl singles by Jack Afro, Billie the Vision & the Dancers, Pizzy Yelliot, The Book of Lists and Jahcoozi in the first three months of its creation between May and July. The label's first album distribution, Cannery Hours by The Occasion, came on 17 July 2006. The label followed this with the release of "Wasted Little DJs" by The View on 7 August 2006. This single was the first charting single associated with the label, reaching #15 in the UK Singles Chart.

NME Presents: Independent Thinking

On 11 November 2006, 1965 Records were given their first push into the public eye. Music publication NME released a covermount CD with the magazine, titled "NME Presents: Independent Thinking". It contained a number of unreleased tracks by bands signed to the label, such as The Law, The Draytones and Ripchord. The CD was headed by The View, who contributed with a rare live version of "Screamin' n Shoutin'" at Abertay University.

Commercial success
1965 Records gained their first major chart hit with the release of The View's "Same Jeans", which peaked at #3 in the UK Singles Chart on 22 January 2007. One week later, the band would also give the label their first number one album with their debut album Hats Off to the Buskers on 29 January 2007.

Throughout 16–27 May 2007, 1965 Records took part in a joint tour with fellow record label Deltasonic named "The Sonic65 Tour". The tour featured Deltasonic artist Candie Payne and 1965 band The Draytones playing in a number of locations across the UK, including King Tut's Wah Wah Hut in Glasgow as well as the 100 Club in London.

1965 Records was re-launched in 2015.

Artists signed to 1965 Records
Lusts
Dave McCabe & The Ramifications
Man & the Echo
Black Peaches
Coves
Wesley Fuller
Sink Ya Teeth
Nadine Shah

Artists previously signed to 1965 Records
The Clay
Derek Meins (formerly of Eastern Lane)
The Draytones
Holy Ghost Revival
The Hugs
Larry Jon Wilson
The Metros
The Monks Kitchen
Motion Pictures
The Occasion
Ripchord
Toddla T
Twelves Trio
The View

See also
 List of record labels

References

British record labels
Record labels established in 2006
Record labels based in London
Indie rock record labels
Alternative rock record labels